Andrew Shawn Jones (born June 16, 1970) is an American former gridiron football player. He played professionally for the Minnesota Vikings in the National Football League (NFL) as well as the Baltimore Stallions in the Canadian Football League (CFL). Jones was a four-year starter at quarterback for the Georgia Tech Yellow Jackets.

High school
Jones played high school football for the Thomasville High School Bulldogs as a quarterback.

College 
Jones is arguably one of the greatest Georgia Tech Yellow Jackets quarterbacks ever, leading his team to the 1990 UPI National Championship, and amassing 35 wins, 9,296 yards of total offense, and 70 touchdowns over 4 years of collegiate play.  In all of Georgia Tech football history, only Jones and three other quarterbacks started all four years of their collegiate careers.

1990 National Championship/1991 Citrus Bowl 
Jones led the Yellow Jackets to a Division I-A best 11-0-1 Record in 1990 capped off with a 45-21 Citrus Bowl victory over Nebraska.  Jones would be named the Bowl MVP.  Led by Jones, Georgia Tech finished #1 in the Coaches Poll and was the only undefeated team of the 1990 season and would share the title with Colorado who finished #1 in the AP Poll.

Professional career 
After college, Shawn went into the NFL as an undrafted safety.  He played one game for the Minnesota Vikings in 1993.

He found a quarterback position from 1994–1995 for the short-lived Baltimore Stallions, an American expansion team in the Canadian Football League.  He would back up former Georgia Southern quarterback Tracy Ham as the Stallions became the only American expansion team to ever win the Grey Cup.

Records/Accomplishments 
Georgia Tech Athletics Hall of Fame (2003)
Citrus Bowl MVP (1991)
Georgia Tech-3rd All-Time Career Total Offense Leaders 9,296 yards
Georgia Tech-2nd All-Time Career Passing Leaders 8,441 yards

See also 

 List of Georgia Tech Yellow Jackets starting quarterbacks
 Georgia Tech Yellow Jackets football statistical leaders

References

Living people
1970 births
American football quarterbacks
Georgia Tech Yellow Jackets football players
Minnesota Vikings players
Baltimore Stallions players
People from Thomasville, Georgia
Players of American football from Georgia (U.S. state)
Canadian football quarterbacks